Veni Milanov Markovski is a Bulgarian Internet pioneer, co-founder and CEO (until 2002) of bol.bg, the second in the history of Bulgaria Internet Service Provider. He is currently ICANN's Vice-President for UN engagement, based in New York.

Biography 
Markovski is a graduate of the Law Faculty of the Sofia University «St. Kliment Ohridski» with Master of Science degree in law (1997).

Markovski first came into contact with the Internet in September 1990, by becoming one of the first system operators of a Bulletin Board System, part of FidoNet in Sofia, Bulgaria.

In 1993 he co-founded and was CEO until 2002 of bol.bg, the first in the Internet history of Bulgaria Internet Service Provider in the capital, Sofia (and second overall in the country), which was using in the beginning the Russian Moscow-based private network GlasNet to connect to the Internet. In 1995 Markovski co-founded the Internet Society of Bulgaria – a non-profit think tank, promoting Internet usage and digital rights in Bulgaria. The company was sold entirely in 2008 to a foreign investor.

Markovski was project managing a number of Free/Open Source Software projects, funded by the UNDP and the European Union.

From 2006 until 2009, Markovski was senior adviser on international projects to the chairman of Bulgarian State Agency for IT and Communications to the Council of Ministers. From December 2012 he was ICANN's Vice-President, responsible for Russia, Eastern Europe, and the CIS (He was the ICANN's regional manager for the same region since 2007.). Starting March 20, 2014 he's vice-president, responsible for relations with the UN, UN agencies, and the permanent missions to the UN. He is the CEO of a privately held consulting company, and participates regularly in events, related to Internet public policy and cybersecurity.

As head of the Internet Society - Bulgaria, Markovski has been member of the Bulgarian delegation to the U.N. World Summit on Information Society (WSIS) in 2003 and 2005, and is regularly participating in ITU-related events since 2002. He participated in the negotiations of the WSIS+10 Review in 2015, and in December that year addressed the U.N. General Assembly.

For 10 years he was chairman of the IT advisory committee to the Bulgarian President Georgi Parvanov (Bulgarian Socialist Party; March 2002 – January 2012) – a non-paid position, where he served together with people like Vint Cerf, George Sadowsky, Esther Dyson and others. Markovski has been a Member of the ICANN Board (June 2003 – December 2006), he also served as a member of the board of trustees of the international Internet Society from 2002 to 2007, and was on the board of directors of the CPSR (2003–2005).

Markovski is a passionate speaker, blogger and author with articles, stories and interviews on different topics, and at all types of media, including newspapers, journals, online outlets, for radio and TV. He has written one book, "Caught in the Net", published by the Sofia University Publishing House.

References

External links 

www.veni.com
blog.veni.com
Twitter.com/veni
Facebook.com/VeniMarkovskiPublic

1968 births
Businesspeople from Sofia
Bulgarian expatriates in the United States
Internet pioneers
Internet Society people
Living people
Macedonian Bulgarians
Businesspeople from Skopje